The Croatian men's national ice hockey team represents Croatia in IIHF ice hockey competitions. It is organized by the Croatian Ice Hockey Federation. In 2015, the team was ranked 26th in the world by the IIHF. At the 2014 Men's World Ice Hockey Championships Croatia currently competes in 2014 Division I B.

World Championship record

Division I
before: Group B

Division II
before: Group C, Group C1

Division III
before: Group D, Group C2

All-time record against other nations
As of 20 April 2013.

Biggest Wins

 Biggest Losses

References

External links

IIHF profile
National Teams of Ice Hockey

 
Ice hockey teams in Croatia
National ice hockey teams in Europe